The State Government Insurance Office (SGIO) was a statutory authority in Queensland, Australia.

History

The Queensland Government established the State Government Insurance Office (SGIO) on 1 February 1917. The existing State Accident Insurance Office became the Workers' Compensation Department of the SGIO. The SGIO was responsible for insuring state assets and offering life insurance and general insurance (house, car) to the Queensland public.

On 1 March 1986 it was merged into Suncorp.

References

External links 

 SGIO Building with Alice Hampson Digital Story, State Library of Queensland as a part of the Hot Modernism Digital Story Collection

Government agencies of Queensland
Insurance organizations
Defunct government entities of Australia